The Samsung Captivate Glide (SGH-i927) as it is called in the United States, and sold as the Samsung Galaxy S Glide (SGH-i927R) in Canada, is the first physical QWERTY Galaxy S class smartphone running under the Android operating system to be released by Samsung for AT&T (US) and Rogers Wireless (Canada).

Despite being named for the Captivate, a member of the original Galaxy S line, the Glide is part of the Galaxy S II series of phones. It does, however feature a handful of differences from the flagship Galaxy S II, including a slightly smaller Super AMOLED screen featuring a PenTile matrix like that of the original Galaxy S. It also features an Nvidia Tegra 2 running at 1 GHz, and 8 GB of internal storage rather than 16 GB.

Availability
The Samsung SGH-i927 has only been officially sold in the United States and Canada. The US model is subsidized but locked to the AT&T network when bought with their packages. The phone's front face is branded with the AT&T logo. The Canadian model is subsidized but locked to the Rogers network when bought with their packages. The phone itself does not have any Rogers branding on the housing.

The phone is not selling through any Samsung authorized retail channels outside the US or Canada. However these variants can be bought locked or unlocked, from US or Canada at their full retail prices, from various retailers, and exported around the world. This allows them to be used on compatible GSM networks around the world, provided they are unlocked.

Software
The device shipped with Android 2.3.5 (Gingerbread). In September 2012, AT&T released the Android 4.0 (Ice Cream Sandwich) update via Samsung Kies. However, there were several bugs with the ICS update; due to an error in Quality Control, the light on the hardware keyboard is disabled as well as issues with the lock screen and several problems with the phone portion of the OS. Samsung put the update on hold while they worked to optimize the update and fix the bugs. On November 10, the ICS update was re-released with bug fixes that corrected the issues from the first release.

Rooting and unofficial development
xda-developers managed to gain root access to the device on 5 December 2011, and posted a how to guide. Since then, many popular custom recoveries (including ClockworkMod and TWRP) have been made available for it. There are also stable custom ROMs available that can upgrade the phone to Android 4.4.4 KitKat. Many of them, especially the KitKat-based ones are still in active development.

Carrier software

AT&T variant
The AT&T version of the ROM has carrier restrictions in place that doesn't allow manual toggling of networks between 2G, 3G or 4G bands, where dropping down to 2G frequencies is effective in conserving battery life. These restrictions can be overcome by manually entering service commands or rooting the device and flashing with ROMs that are free of these limitations. The AT&T variant was originally shipped with the Carrier IQ monitoring software, however an Android OS upgrade to 2.3.6 Gingerbread (I927UCKL1) is believed to have removed it.

Rogers variant
The Rogers version of the ROM doesn't have any such restrictions, and also enables SMS delivery reports.
It appears that the ICS (Android 4.x) update is not yet available for the SGH-i927R model which possess a different Firmware version to the AT&T models. The Canadian version from Rogers, SGH-i927R, is believed to be free of Carrier IQ.

Image Gallery

References

External links

 Samsung Captivate™ Glide (Samsung US)
 Galaxy S Glide (Samsung Canada)
 ATT Shop Page
 Rogers Shop Page
 Samsung Captivate Glide - xda-developers

Notable reviews
 Phonedog - Samsung Captivate Glide Video Review - Part 1, Part 2
 GSMArena - Samsung Captivate Glide review: Thumbs ready
 Engadget - Samsung Captivate Glide review
 SlashGear - Samsung Captivate Glide review
 MobileSyrup - Samsung Galaxy S Glide Review (Video)

Android (operating system) devices
Samsung smartphones
Mobile phones introduced in 2011
Mobile phones with an integrated hardware keyboard
Mobile phones with user-replaceable battery
Slider phones